The Jessie M. Raymond House is a house located in southeast Portland, Oregon, listed on the National Register of Historic Places.

Further reading

See also
 National Register of Historic Places listings in Southeast Portland, Oregon

References

1907 establishments in Oregon
Bungalow architecture in Oregon
Houses completed in 1907
Houses on the National Register of Historic Places in Portland, Oregon
Portland Eastside MPS
Sunnyside, Portland, Oregon
Portland Historic Landmarks